John Derrick Percy Lomas (born 19 August 1958) is an Anglican bishop in Wales, serving as the Bishop of Swansea and Brecon since 2021.

Education

He was educated at St Michael's College, Llandaff. After serving as Archdeacon of Wrexham since October 2018, it announced on 4 November 2021 that Lomas had been elected to serve as the next Bishop of Swansea and Brecon. He legally took up his see when his election was confirmed at a Sacred Synod for that purpose on 22 November 2021; he was later consecrated into bishop's orders by Andy John, the new Archbishop of Wales (who had first to be elected by the Electoral College, which included all six bishops, including Lomas).

Lomas was consecrated a bishop on 26 February 2022, by Andy John, Archbishop of Wales and Bishop of Bangor, at Bangor Cathedral.

Career

Made deacon, 1994
Ordained priest, 1995
Curate, Rhyl, 1994–2000
 Chaplain Royal Navy, 2000–01
 Vicar, Holywell; also Area Dean 2001–11
 Corwen, 2011–13
 Bangor Monachorum, 2013–14
 Rector, Caerwys  2015- 
 Archdeacon of St Asaph, 1 December 20142018
 Archdeacon of Wrexham, 7 October 2018
 Bishop of Swansea and Brecon, 22 November 2021
Consecrated bishop, 2022

References

1958 births
Archdeacons of St Asaph
Bishops of Swansea and Brecon
Alumni of St Michael's College, Llandaff
Living people